Sunnyside, also known as Sunnyside House, Sunnyside Farm, The Sycamores, and Telford, is a historic home located near Lexington, Rockbridge County, Virginia. The original section was built about 1790, and is a three-story, five-bay, Federal style brick dwelling. A rear wing was added about 1805, parlor addition in the 1840s, the east end addition in the 1860s, projecting gable windows in the 1880s-1890s, and the north and south porches in the 1940s.  Also on the property are the contributing cottage (early-19th century), dairy, machine shed, granary, garage, calving barn, and shed.

It was listed on the National Register of Historic Places in 2002.

Gallery

References

Houses on the National Register of Historic Places in Virginia
Federal architecture in Virginia
Houses completed in 1790
Houses in Rockbridge County, Virginia
National Register of Historic Places in Rockbridge County, Virginia
1790 establishments in Virginia